Racomitrium is a genus of mosses in the family Grimmiaceae established in 1818 by Samuel Elisée Bridel-Brideri. It contains the following species:

Racomitrium aciculare 
Racomitrium aduncoides 
Racomitrium affine 
Racomitrium afoninae 
Racomitrium alare 
Racomitrium albipiliferum 
Racomitrium albipiliferum 
Racomitrium andreaeoides 
Racomitrium angustifolium 
Racomitrium aquaticum 
Racomitrium aterrimum 
Racomitrium austrogeorgicum 
Racomitrium barbuloides 
Racomitrium bartramii 
Racomitrium brachypus 
Racomitrium brevipes 
Racomitrium brevisetum 
Racomitrium canaliculatum 
Racomitrium canescens 
Racomitrium carinatum 
Racomitrium chrysoblastum 
Racomitrium crispipilum 
Racomitrium crispulum 
Racomitrium crumianum 
Racomitrium cucullatifolium 
Racomitrium cucullatulum 
Racomitrium curiosissimum 
Racomitrium decurrens 
Racomitrium depressum 
Racomitrium dichelymoides 
Racomitrium didymum 
Racomitrium durum 
Racomitrium ellipticum 
Racomitrium elongatum 
Racomitrium emersum 
Racomitrium ericoides 
Racomitrium fasciculare 
Racomitrium fastigiatum 
Racomitrium flavo-pallidum 
Racomitrium flettii 
Racomitrium funale 
Racomitrium fuscescens 
Racomitrium genuflexum 
Racomitrium gracillimum 
Racomitrium grimmioides 
Racomitrium hausmannianum 
Racomitrium helvolum 
Racomitrium hespericum 
Racomitrium heterostichoides 
Racomitrium heterostichum 
Racomitrium himalayanum 
Racomitrium hyalinocuspidatum 
Racomitrium japonicum 
Racomitrium joseph-hookeri 
Racomitrium kerguelense 
Racomitrium laetum 
Racomitrium laevigatum 
Racomitrium lamprocarpum 
Racomitrium lanuginosum 
Racomitrium lawtonae 
Racomitrium lepervanchei 
Racomitrium lusitanicum 
Racomitrium macounii 
Racomitrium marginatum 
Racomitrium membranaceum 
Racomitrium microcarpum 
Racomitrium microcarpum 
Racomitrium minutum 
Racomitrium muticum 
Racomitrium nigritum 
Racomitrium nigroviride 
Racomitrium nipponicum 
Racomitrium nitidulum 
Racomitrium nivale 
Racomitrium norrisii 
Racomitrium obesum 
Racomitrium obtusifolium 
Racomitrium obtusum 
Racomitrium occidentale 
Racomitrium ochraceum 
Racomitrium orientale 
Racomitrium orthotrichaceum 
Racomitrium pachydictyon 
Racomitrium pacificum 
Racomitrium panschii 
Racomitrium papeetense 
Racomitrium patagonicum 
Racomitrium phyllanthum 
Racomitrium pruinosum 
Racomitrium pruinosum 
Racomitrium pseudoaciculare 
Racomitrium pseudopatens 
Racomitrium ptychophyllum 
Racomitrium pygmaeum 
Racomitrium rigidissimum 
Racomitrium rupestre 
Racomitrium ryszardii 
Racomitrium seychellarum 
Racomitrium steerei 
Racomitrium strictifolium 
Racomitrium subcrispipilum 
Racomitrium sublamprocarpum 
Racomitrium subnigritum 
Racomitrium subrupestre 
Racomitrium subsecundum 
Racomitrium subulifolium 
Racomitrium sudeticum 
Racomitrium sulcipilum 
Racomitrium sullivanii 
Racomitrium symphyodontum 
Racomitrium valdon-smithii 
Racomitrium varium 
Racomitrium venustum 
Racomitrium verrucosum 
Racomitrium visnadiae 
Racomitrium vulcanicola 
Racomitrium vulcanicum 
Racomitrium willii 
Racomitrium zygodonticaule

References

External links

Moss genera
Grimmiales